Resource management is the deployment of organizational resources when and where they are needed.

Resource management may also refer to:

Physical resources
Environmental resource management, the management of human societies interacting with the environment
Natural resource management, the management of natural resources 
Water resource management, managing the use of water resources

People
Human resource management, the management process of an organization's workforce
Human resource management system, the systems and processes between human resource management and information technology
Human resource management in public administration, human resource management as it applies to public administration
Crew resource management,  a set of training procedures used primarily for improving air safety
Maintenance resource management, an aircraft maintenance variant on crew resource management
Single-Pilot Resource Management, an adaptation of Crew Resource Management training to single-pilot operations
Cultural resources management, the management of cultural resources, such as the arts and heritage

Computing and technology
Resource management (computing), the management of physical or virtual computer components
Radio resource management, the system level control of radio transmission characteristics in wireless communication 
Storage resource management, optimizing the efficiency and speed of a storage area network 
Electronic resource management, the practices and systems used by libraries to track electronic information resources
Data resource management, an organizational function in information systems and computer science that manages data resources
Distributed resource management, the management of unattended background program execution in computing known as a job scheduler

Legislation
Resource Management Act 1991, a New Zealand law promoting sustainable management of natural and physical resources
Resource Management System, a system of conservation practices and management specified in the United States' 2002 Farm Bill

Other uses
Resource management (gaming), a mechanic in various types of games

See also
Resource allocation, the assigning of available resources